The following list of ethnic groups is a partial list of United States cities and towns in which a majority (over 50%) of the population is Asian American or Asian, according to the United States Census Bureau. This list does not include cities in which, according to the U.S. Census Bureau, merely a plurality (as opposed to a majority) of the residents are Asian American. The list below is organized by state or territory and, within each state or territory, by population size. The percentage of each city's population that is Asian American is listed in parentheses next to the city's name.

There are 51 communities in four states and two territories with Asian-American majority populations.

Cities with the highest percentage of Asian-Americans

Cities with the highest number of Asian-Americans

California

Places with more than 100,000 people
 Daly City (55.6%)
 Sunnyvale (52.8%)
 Fremont (50.6%)
 Santa Clara (50.1%)

Places with between 25,000 and 100,000 people (2020)
 Milpitas (73.9%)
 Cupertino (72.9%)
 Walnut (69.2%)
 Monterey Park (68.0%)
 Arcadia (66.9%)
 Temple City (65.5%)
 Cerritos (65.3%)
 San Gabriel (65.1%)
 Rosemead (65.1%)
 Rowland Heights (63.0%)
 Diamond Bar (61.7%)
 Union City (61.6%)
 Dublin (58.6%)
 Saratoga (57.3%)
 Foster City (57.1%)
 San Ramon (55.0%)
 Alhambra (53.4%)
 Westminster (53.3%)
 Hercules (50.8%)

Places with fewer than 25,000 people
 San Marino (64.2%)
 Mountain House (58.5%)
 South San Gabriel (58.5%)
 East San Gabriel (57.2%)
 Millbrae (56.2%)
 La Palma (53.5%)
 Broadmoor (50.8%)

Guam

Places with fewer than 25,000 people
 Tamuning (including Tumon) (50.0%)

Hawaii

Places with more than 100,000 people
 Honolulu (54.8%)

Places with between 25,000 and 100,000 people
 Waipahu (67.1%)
 Pearl City (53.2%)

Places with fewer than 25,000 people
 Kaumakani (77.3%)
 'Ewa Villages (70.4%)
 Whitmore Village (65.9%)
 Puhi (65.7%)
 'Ele`ele (61.8%)
 Hamamaulu (61.5%)
 Lāna`i City (58.1%)
 Village Park (57.9%)
 'Aiea (57.7%)
 Kea`au (57.7%)
 Waipio (54.7%)
 Pepe`ekeo (54.7%)
 Kahului (53.6%)
 Pāhoa (52.4%)
 Waialua (51.9%)
 Hālawa (51.6%)
 'Ewa Gentry (51.4%)

New Jersey

Places with fewer than 25,000 people
 Palisades Park (57.8%)

Northern Mariana Islands

Places with between 25,000 and 100,000 people

 Saipan (50.9%) 
 Garapan, Saipan (81.2%) 
 Chalan Piao, Sapian (71.9%) 
 China Town, Saipan (77.2%) 
 Chalan Kanoa I, Saipan (66.9%)

Pennsylvania

Places with fewer than 25,000 people (2020)
 Millbourne (63.2%)

Virginia
Navy (50.1%)

National rankings (2000)

Places with over 100,000 people
 Honolulu, Hawaii (55.9%)
 Daly City, California (50.7%)

Places with between 25,000 and 100,000 people
 Waipahu, Hawaii (65.8%)
 Monterey Park, California (61.8%)

Places with fewer than 25,000 people
 Kaumakani, Hawaii (77.3%)
 Ewa Villages, Hawaii (70.4%)

See also
 Lists of United States cities with large ethnic minority populations
 List of U.S. cities with large Cambodian-American populations
 List of U.S. cities with significant Chinese-American populations
 List of U.S. cities with large Filipino-American populations
 List of U.S. cities with large Japanese-American populations
 List of U.S. cities with significant Korean-American populations
 List of U.S. cities with large Vietnamese-American populations

References

Asian-American issues
Asian American

Hawaii-related lists
California-related lists